The Apertura 2010 season (officially known as Torneo Apertura 2010) was the 25th edition of Primera División de Fútbol de El Salvador since its establishment of an Apertura and Clausura format. Isidro Metapán, being the defending champions, kept the title as they won the final against Alianza on penalties. The season begun on July 31 and concluded on December 19, 2010. Like previous years, the league consisted of 10 teams, each playing a home and away game against the other clubs for a total of 18 games, respectively. The top four teams by the end of the regular season took part of the playoffs.

Promotion and relegation 
Teams promoted from 2009–10 Segunda División
 UES
 Once Municipal

Teams relegated to 2010–11 Segunda División
 Alacranes Del Norte
 Municipal Limeño

Team information
Last updated: June 30, 2010

Stadia and locations

Personnel and sponsoring

Managerial changes

Before the start of the season

During the regular season

League table

Results

Playoffs

Semi-finals

First leg

Second leg

Final

Top scorers

 Updated to games played on November 28, 2010. 
 Post-season goals are not included, only regular season goals.

List of foreign players in the league
This is a list of foreign players in Clausura 2010. The following players:
 have played at least one apetura game for the respective club.
 have not been capped for the El Salvador national football team on any level, independently from the birthplace

A new rule was introduced this season that clubs can only have three foreign players per club and can only add a new player if there is an injury or player/s is released.

C.D. Águila
  Patricio Barroche
  Gabriel Antero
  Nicolás Muñoz

Alianza F.C.
  José Oliveira 
  Willer Souza

Atlético Marte
  Glauber Da Silva
  Alcides Bandera
  Julio Maya

Atlético Balboa
  Luis Torres
  Julián Cruz
  Roberto Oliveira

C.D. FAS
  Alejandro Bentos
  Rodolfo Córdoba  
  Roberto Peña
  Pablo Quandt
 (player released mid season)

C.D. Luis Ángel Firpo
  Fernando Leguizamón
  Hermes Martínez
  Erick Scott

A.D. Isidro Metapán
  Ernesto Aquino
  Anel Canales
  Paolo Suárez

Once Municipal
  Andres Medina 
  Miguel Solís
  Luis Espindola
  Elder Figueroa

UES
  Cristian González
  Manuel García
  Gabriel Garcete

Vista Hermosa
  John Castillo
  Wilson Sánchez
  Franklin Webster 
  Leonardo Da Silva
  Israel Garcia

External links
 El Grafico League Coverage 

Primera División de Fútbol Profesional Apertura seasons
El
1